The Changchun Ring Expressway, designated as G2501 is an expressway in northeastern China orbiting the city of Changchun.  This expressway is a branch of G1 Jingha Expressway.

Route

The route is entirely located in Changchun Metropolitan Area.

References

Expressways in Jilin
Chinese national-level expressways
Transport in Changchun